Govindan Sundararajan is an Indian materials engineer, known for his contributions in the areas of Surface Engineering and Ballistics. The Government of India honoured him, in 2014, by awarding him the Padma Shri, the fourth highest civilian award, for his contributions to the fields of science and technology.

Biography
Govindan Sundararajan was born in Andhra Pradesh on 11 December 1953. He graduated in metallurgical engineering from the Indian Institute of Technology, Madras in 1976, followed by master's degree (MS) in 1979 and doctoral degree of PhD from the Ohio State University, Columbus, USA in 1981. He returned to India the next year to start his career as a scientist with the Defence Metallurgical Research Laboratory (DMRL), in 1982. In 1997, he joined the International Advanced Research Centre for Powder Metallurgy and New Materials (ARCI) as its Director and currently holds the position.

Legacy

Sundararajan is credited with extensive research on tribological behavior of materials and composites. An expert in specialty coatings, Govindarajan's research findings have assisted in developing advanced thermal spray coating for the Kaveri Engine Programme (GTRE GTX-35VS Kaveri). He has been instrumental in the establishment of many advanced research facilities such as the ARCI Center for Laser Processing of Materials, ARCI Surface Engineering Division, Center for Fuel Cell Technology, Chennai and the ARCI Centre for Sol-Gel Nanocomposite Coatings, all of which bear testimony to Govindarajan's design and fabrication abilities. It was under his leadership, the Advanced Materials Technology Incubator (AMT), an ARCI venture which at present, is home to five companies, was established. He is reported to have been successful in commercializing the technologies on behalf of ARCI, all the five companies under the Incubator programme being beneficiaries of technology transfer from ARCI.

Govindarajan is credited with many inventions for which he holds 5 patents.

 
 
 
 
 

Sundararajan has attended many seminars and conferences where he has delivered keynote addresses. He has also published several articles, over 170 in number, in national and international peer reviewed journals.

Awards and recognitions
Govindan Sundararajan is a winner of many awards and honours including the Government of India honour of Shanti Swarup Bhatnagar Prize in 1994. He has also received Best Metallurgist award in 1995 and the FICCI award for Materials Science in 2004. Institutions such as Indian Academy of Sciences in 1992, Indian National Science Academy in 1996, Indian National Academy of Engineering in 1999, National Academy of Sciences in 2002, Indian Institute of Metals in 2002, and ASM International in 2005, honoured Sundararajan with fellowships. He has also received J. C. Bose fellowship during 2006-2011. The Government of India honored Sundararajan again with the Padma Shri by including him in the 2014 Republic Day Honours.

See also

 GTRE GTX-35VS Kaveri
 Defence Metallurgical Research Laboratory

References

Further reading

External links 
 

1953 births
Living people
Recipients of the Padma Shri in science & engineering
Fellows of the Indian National Science Academy
Fellows of the Indian Academy of Sciences
Fellows of The National Academy of Sciences, India
Indian metallurgists
Engineers from Andhra Pradesh
20th-century Indian engineers
Indian materials scientists
Fellows of the Indian National Academy of Engineering
Recipients of the Shanti Swarup Bhatnagar Award in Engineering Science